Fortis Creek is a national park located in New South Wales, Australia,  north of Sydney.

The park is positioned to the north and northeast in the Banyabba Nature Reserve. The surrounding villages are Copmanhurst, Lawrence and Ulmarra.

See also 
 Protected areas of New South Wales

References 

National parks of New South Wales
Protected areas established in 1997
1997 establishments in Australia